Six ships of the Royal Navy have borne the name HMS Folkestone or the archaic HMS Folkeston, after the town of Folkestone in Kent:

  was a cog, part of the Cinque Ports Fleet in 1299.
  was a 44-gun fourth rate launched in 1703 and broken up in 1727.
  was a 44-gun fifth rate launched in 1741 and sold in 1749.
  (or Folkestone), was an 8-gun cutter launched in 1764. On 24 June 1778 the French frigate  captured her off Ushant. The French navy purchased Folkestone for Lt12,405 and took her into service under her existing name. She was struck off the lists in 1782 or early 1783.
  was a World War I minesweeper. A mercantile conversion, M.33 (1914). Built 1903, 496 GRT. Armament was two 12 pdr guns. In service from 9 October 1914 to 31 January 1920. 
  was a  launched in 1930, sold in 1947 and broken up later that year.

Citations

References
Demerliac, Alain (1996) La Marine De Louis XVI: Nomenclature Des Navires Français De 1774 À 1792. (Nice: Éditions OMEGA). 

Royal Navy ship names